Yuba City High School is a public secondary school in Yuba City, California. It had roughly 3,000 students before River Valley High School opened in 2005. The school colors are brown and gold. Its mascot is the "Honker", a nickname for Canada geese.

Athletics
Yuba City High School's athletic program used to compete in Division I of the Sac-Joaquin Section as a member of the Sierra Foothill League (until 1970), North Metro League (1970–76), Delta League (1976–1998, 2000–02), Capital Athletic League (1998–2000) and Metro Conference (2002–06). However, with the opening of River Valley High School, Yuba City's enrollment split in half and the Honkers moved to the Division III Tri-County Conference in fall 2006. Yuba City began competing in the Capital Valley Conference beginning in fall 2018.

Fall sports
American football, girls' tennis, girls' volleyball, girls' field hockey, cross country, girls' golf

Winter sports
Boys' basketball, girls' basketball, wrestling, boys' soccer, girls' soccer

Spring sports
Boys' baseball, boys' golf, boys' tennis, softball, swimming, diving, track & field, competitive stunt cheer

Mel Good 
Every December, Yuba City High School hosts a basketball tournament called the Mel Good Holiday Classic, which is one of the biggest tournaments in Northern California. Teams from all over Northern California come to the school and are hosted by YCHS students.

Music
Yuba City High School has a marching and concert band, full orchestra and chorus. The Yuba City High School marching band was renamed the "Brown and Gold Brigade" in 2009. After school, students are invited to participate in Pep Band, Jazz Band and Winter Percussion.

Clubs and organizations

Clubs
Asian Pacific Islanders Student Union (APISU), AP Spanish Literature, Art Club, ASB (Associated Student Body), AVID Club, Baseball Club, Cheer Club, CSF, Culinary Arts & Design, D.I.G, Football Club, French Club, (FFA) Future Farmers of America, Gamer's Club (1337), German Club, Guitar Club, Interact Club, Japanese Culture Club, Key Club, M.E.C.H.A., Photography Club, Punjabi American Club, Running Club, S.C.A.W., Sikh Student Association, SLAM (Students Learning About Medicine), Snowboarding Club, Softball Club, Speech & Debate, Swim & Dive Club, Tennis Club, Wrestling Club

Yuba City High School bus tragedy 
One teacher and 27 students died, leaving 24 survivors out of 52 passengers on the bus. The Marina Vista exit has since been renamed Waterfront.

Notable alumni 

Chris Petersen – American football coach of Washington Huskies, two-time Paul "Bear" Bryant Award winner coaching Boise State; class of 1983
Max Stassi – MLB catcher for Los Angeles Angels; class of 2009
Robert Holley – South Korean television star; class of 1976
Darryl Scott –  MLB pitcher for California Angels and minor-league pitching coordinator for Colorado Rockies; class of 1986.
Ron Porter - NFL linebacker for seven seasons, played for Colts, Eagles and Vikings; class of 1963; played in Super Bowl III

References

External links
 Yuba City Unified School District
 Yuba City High School Class of 1963

Yuba City, California
High schools in Sutter County, California
Public high schools in California